A student design competition is a specific form of a student competition relating to design. Design competitions can be technical or purely aesthetic. The objective of technical competitions is to introduce students to real-world engineering situations and to teach students project-management and fabrication techniques used in industry. Aesthetic competitions usually require art and design skills.

Both students and industry benefit from intercollegiate design competitions.  Each competition allows students to apply the theories and information they have learning in the class room to real situations.  Industry gains better prepared and more experienced engineers.

History 

Through the 1970s only one competition of significance existed: Mini Baja.  Today, almost every field of engineering has several design competitions, which have extended from college down into high school (e.g., FIRST Robotics) and even younger grades (e.g., FIRST Lego League). The Society of Automotive Engineers organizes the largest design competitions, including Baja SAE, Sunryce, and Formula SAE.

Notable design competitions 

 Civil engineering
 Great Northern Concrete Toboggan Race
 Concrete canoe
 Steel bridge
 Mechanical engineering
 Baja SAE
 Basic Utility Vehicle
 Formula SAE
 Human Powered Vehicle Challenge (HPVC)
 ASABE International 1/4 Scale Tractor Student Design Competition

 Robotics Competitions
 DARPA Grand Challenge
 International Space Settlement Design Competition
 NASA's Lunabotics Competition
 RoboCup Soccer
 Multi-Disciplinary Competitions
 Stanford Center on Longevity Design Challenge

See also 
 Student competition
 University of Patras Formula Student Team - UoP Racing Team

Competitions
Student events